The 1979–80 season was Cardiff City F.C.'s 53rd season in the Football League. They competed in the 22-team Division Two, then the second tier of English football, finishing fifteenth.

Players

 

    

 

Source.

League standings

Results by round

Fixtures and results

Second Division

Source

League Cup

FA Cup

Welsh Cup

See also
Cardiff City F.C. seasons

References

Bibliography

Welsh Football Data Archive

Cardiff City F.C. seasons
Association football clubs 1979–80 season
Card